Dirk Donker Curtius (19 October 1792 in 's-Hertogenbosch – 17 July 1864 in Spa) was a Dutch politician who served as Minister of Justice between 1848 to 1849, and again from 1853 to 1856.

References
  Parlement.com biography

1792 births
1864 deaths
Leiden University alumni
Ministers of Justice of the Netherlands
People from 's-Hertogenbosch